San Miguel Food and Beverage, Inc. (formerly San Miguel Pure Foods Company, Inc.) is a Philippine food and beverage company headquartered in Pasig, Metro Manila. It is the largest food and beverage company in the Philippines, with nearly 3,000 employees deployed in a nationwide network of offices, farms, manufacturing, processing and distribution facilities. The company is a subsidiary of San Miguel Corporation (SMC).

History
The company was incorporated in 1956 as Pure Foods Corporation, a manufacturer of processed meats marketed under the Purefoods brand name. Ayala Corporation acquired substantial shares in the company in 1965 and majority control in 1981.

In 2001, San Miguel Corporation (SMC) acquired Pure Foods Corporation from Ayala Corporation. Following the acquisition, the entire food division of SMC was consolidated under Pure Foods Corporation and the company was renamed San Miguel Pure Foods Company, Inc. Its integrated operations range from breeding, contract growing, processing, and marketing of chicken, pork and beef to the manufacture of refrigerated, canned and ready-to-cook meat products, ice cream, butter, cheese, margarine, oils and fats, as well as animal and aquatic feeds. It holds in its portfolio some of the most formidable brands in the Philippine food industry. Sixty per cent of its sales comes from poultry, feeds and meats; branded businesses, processed meats, coffee and dairy; and flour. As at July 16, 2013, San Miguel Pure Foods had a market share of over 40%, and is the Philippines' leading poultry producer.

On November 6, 2017, SMC announced the consolidation of its beverage businesses into San Miguel Pure Foods Company, Inc. through a $6.6-billion share swap deal. San Miguel Pure Foods Company, Inc. would acquire 7.86 billion shares in San Miguel Brewery, Inc. and 216.97 million shares in Ginebra San Miguel, Inc. from SMC. After the consolidation, San Miguel Pure Foods Company, Inc. would be renamed San Miguel Food and Beverage, Inc. San Miguel Pure Foods Company, Inc. held a special stockholder meeting on January 18, 2018, which approved the amendments to the Articles of Incorporation and the share swap transaction. After the consolidation, SMC intended to sell up to 30% of the company to foreign investors to raise roughly $3 billion for future investments. The sale would be done through a private placement in 2018.

On March 23, 2018, the SEC approved the change in corporate name and amendments in the company's Articles of Incorporation. The company's PSE ticker symbol was changed to  effective April 5, 2018.

Subsidiaries
 San Miguel Foods (group)
 The Purefoods-Hormel Company, Inc. (joint venture with Hormel Foods)
 Magnolia, Inc.
 Sugarland Corporation
 Golden Food and Dairy Creamery Corporation
 Realsnacks Manufacturing Corporation
 San Miguel Foods, Inc.
 San Miguel Mills, Inc.
 Golden Bay Grain Terminal Corporation
 Golden Avenue Corporation
 San Miguel Super Coffeemix Company, Inc.
 San Miguel Pure Foods International, Ltd.
 San Miguel Pure Foods Investment (BVI), Ltd.
 San Miguel Pure Foods Vietnam Company, Ltd. (formerly, San Miguel Hormel Vietnam Company, Ltd.)
 P.T. San Miguel Pure Foods Indonesia
  San Miguel Brewery, Inc.
 San Miguel Brewing International Ltd.
 Ginebra San Miguel, Inc.

Sports team
Magnolia Hotshots (PBA)

References

External links
San Miguel Food and Beverage, Inc.
San Miguel Corporation

Food and drink companies of the Philippines
Dairy products companies of the Philippines
Drink companies of the Philippines
Meat companies of the Philippines
San Miguel Corporation subsidiaries
Companies based in Pasig
Companies based in Mandaluyong
Food and drink companies established in 1956
1956 establishments in the Philippines
Companies listed on the Philippine Stock Exchange
Condiment companies of the Philippines
Coffee companies of the Philippines